At the front part of the auricula, where the helix bends upward, is a small projection of cartilage, called the spina helicis.

References 

Ear